was a Kamakura period nobleman and poet. Eighty six of his poems are represented in the official collection . He also has a personal collection, .

References

1241 births
1301 deaths
Fujiwara clan
Asukai family
13th-century Japanese poets